Around 6 is an album by trumpeter Kenny Wheeler recorded in 1979 and released on the ECM label.

Reception
The Allmusic review by Scott Yanow awarded the album 4 stars stating "the sextet performs six Wheeler originals that combine together advanced swinging with fairly free explorations. Stimulating music.".

Track listing
All compositions by Kenny Wheeler.
 "Mai We Go Round" - 10:36
 "Solo One" - 3:40
 "May Ride" - 7:25
 "Follow Down" - 11:48
 "Riverrun" - 7:44
 "Lost Woltz" - 5:30

Personnel
Kenny Wheeler — trumpet, flugelhorn
Evan Parker — soprano saxophone, tenor saxophone
Eje Thelin — trombone
Tom van der Geld — vibraharp
Jean-Francois Jenny-Clark — bass
Edward Vesala — drums

References

ECM Records albums
Kenny Wheeler albums
1980 albums
Albums produced by Manfred Eicher